If You Knew Suzi... is the fifth regular studio album by Suzi Quatro, released at the end of 1978, but with a 1979 copyright date.  this was still Quatro's highest-charting album in the United States (it peaked at number 37 on The Billboard 200). The album also yielded Quatro's biggest US single hit, a duet with Chris Norman named "Stumblin' In" (which reached number 4 in both The Billboard Hot 100 and the Billboard Adult Contemporary charts. It also had an advertising billboard on Sunset Boulevard.

The credits show the album to be a multinational production: tracks were recorded in Cologne (Germany), Paris (France), and Glendale (California). It was then mixed in California and mastered in London to be distributed by a company based in New York City.

Track listing
"Don't Change My Luck" (Chinn, Chapman) 3:43
"Tired of Waiting" (Ray Davies) 3:29
"Suicide" (Quatro, Len Tuckey) 4:05
"Evie" (Harry Vanda, George Young) 4:35
"The Race Is On" (Chinn, Chapman) 4:02
"If You Can't Give Me Love" (Nicky Chinn, Mike Chapman) 3:53
"Breakdown" (Tom Petty) 3:24
"Non-Citizen" (Quatro, Tuckey) 3:17
"Rock and Roll, Hoochie Koo" (Rick Derringer) 3:24
"Wiser Than You" (Quatro, Tuckey) 3:53

Notes
The US and Canadian pressing of the album omitted the Vanda and Young-penned song "Evie" and included "Stumblin' In" in its replacement. When If You Knew Suzi... was re-released as a "two-fer" with the Suzi ... and Other Four Letter Words album, both "Evie" and "Stumblin' In" were included.

Charts

Personnel
 Mike Chapman producer, writer
 Nicky Chinn writer
 Mike Deacon keyboards, piano, synthesizer, backing vocals
 Dave Neal drums, percussion, backing vocals
 Suzi Quatro lead vocals, backing vocals, bass guitar, congas, writer
 Len Tuckey rhythm guitar, lead guitar, backing vocals, writer

References

External links

Suzi Quatro albums
Rak Records albums
1978 albums
Albums produced by Mike Chapman